The X Class were a class of diesel locomotive built by Beyer, Peacock & Company and Metropolitan-Vickers, Bowesfield Works, Stockton-on-Tees for the Western Australian Government Railways between 1954 and 1956.

Construction
In the early 1950s the Western Australian Government Railways placed the largest single Australian order for diesel locomotives, when it ordered 48 2-Do-2 locomotives from Beyer, Peacock and Company and Metropolitan-Vickers.  All were delivered between 1954 and 1956.

The seeds for the construction of the class were laid in by the then WAGR Chief Mechanical Engineer, Tom Marsland, with a proposal for the acquisition of 87 diesel locomotives, including 3 small jetty shunters, 18 diesel shunters and 66 mainline locomotives, later reduced to 48 when railcars were selected for suburban service. The proposal developed further during discussions with Beyer, Peacock regarding issues with the design of the W Class locomotive.

Operation

The X class revolutionised operations on the WAGR. Their light axle load of around 12 tons meant they could travel on all lines, and the dual cab arrangement eliminated the need for turning. They were quickly allocated to express passenger trains including the Albany Express, Australind, Kalgoorlie Express and The Westland. Although considered as good runners, the eight driving wheels being attached to the rigid main frame caused these locomotives to ride roughly.

The Crossley engine
At the time of construction, the HST-V8 was an untested concept, though the engine itself was an evolution of a design used successfully in patrol boats during World War Two. One line of thought is the motor was an evolution of either of the HRN8 marine diesel, or the HRP8 stationary diesel.

The engines used Crossley's system of exhaust pulse pressure charging and developed 1,200 horsepower (895 kW) at 625 rpm, though in 1981 they were down-rated to 875 hp at 600 rpm. There were no valves, and inlet and exhaust were via ports in the cylinder walls.

Failures commenced within weeks of the first locomotives being unveiled. It was only the skill of staff at WAGR's Midland Railway Workshops that saved the day. In their early days, availability was less than for steam.

The engines burnt and leaked oil, had underfed bearings, vibrated and popped heads and pistons, and suffered from ring scuffing for most of their lives. It was only the engineering excellence, and perseverance of Midland Railway Workshops staff that kept the locomotives operating, and performance improving. In the end, over 600 design faults, mainly in the Crossley engine, were overcome. One of the strategies used to minimise problems was to de-rate the engine to 1045 hp (officially quoted as 1000 hp).

Rumours persisted that the engine was either war surplus, or formerly from a sub-maritime application. Neither of these are correct, despite some publications suggesting this. The myth may have arisen from Crossley's success in delivering robust engines for marine and other modes of transport. Experience in Western Australia with both Metropolitan Vickers and Crossley engines was otherwise positive. It has been noted that the Irish Railways (CIÉ), through the respected Engineer Oliver Bulleid, had "heard" through the British Admiralty that the "Crossley unit gave no trouble".

The Smith Royal Commission into the class identified blind faith in the British manufacturers, and chided the WAGR for ignoring the advice of supervising engineers in the UK who reported problems with the diesel motor during testing. Whilst CIÉ re-engined their similarly powered Crossley 001 Class locomotives to rid themselves of the problem, The Smith Royal Commission recommended against rebuilding, proposing that the entire class be replaced wholesale. To be fair to the WAGR, they were not the only ones that rushed into buying unproven traction: British Railways also did the same, buying many different types of diesel locomotives from many different manufacturers in their haste to dieselise, including purchasing the unsuccessful Class 28 Co-Bo locomotives, which could be regarded as "first cousins" to the WAGR X class.

Multiple unit working

During construction, 16 locomotives were fitted with multiple unit control and denoted as XA class. These locomotives included communication doors at each end, and were numbered in a separate block starting from 1401.

From December 1963, Midland Workshops fitted 10 of the X class for multiple unit working, and these were reclassified as Xb class. Units so converted were not fitted with communication doors, and retained their original 10XX series numbers.

Other modifications
Whilst the class were built with locomotive pneumatic braking and train vacuum braking systems, during 1969 and 1970 eight of the XA class were modified to operate with dual vacuum/air braking systems manufactured by Davies and Metcalfe to allow them to operate air-braked salt traffic on the Esperance Branch. This equipment was removed in the early 1980s, only to be reinstalled in XA 1406 (October 1986) and XA 1403 (November 1986) to allow these units to haul ex-Queensland Railways coaches on suburban services.

End of career
In their final years, those still in service were reputed to have performed well. They ran grain trains in the South West as late as 1984, and provided power for trains following the reopening of the Fremantle line up to the last retirement in 1988.

The first were withdrawn in 1973, primarily as sources of spare parts. The last in service, XA1402 was withdrawn on 31 March 1988, after completing a transfer working.

The last to operate on the public network was XA1401, under the stewardship of Hotham Valley Railway, working a consist of sleeping cars back from Dowerin on 27 August 2004.

Names
The locomotives carried the names of tribes, tribal leaders and warriors from around Australia. Within the WAGR, proposals were made to code the class as "T", and for the class to be known as the "Tribal class". This was not adopted. However, confusion at the time resulted in duplications and incorrect spellings.

Within the WAGR, the class earned the nickname "Hummingbirds" while they were called "Submarines" by rail enthusiasts.

Status list
The 48 locomotives were:

Preservation
One X class and five XA class locomotives have been preserved:
 X 1001 Yalagonga – Rail Heritage WA, Bassendean
 XA 1401 Pedong – Hotham Valley Railway, Dwellingup
 XA 1402 Targari – Rail Heritage WA, Bassendean
 XA 1405 Warienga – Rail Heritage WA, Bassendean
 XA 1411 Weedookarri – Hotham Valley Railway, Dwellingup
 XA 1415 Wurara – Narrogin (in place of Pm706 – on loan to Hotham Valley Railway)

References

Notes

Bibliography

External links

X Class at Collie – Video
CO BO World

Beyer, Peacock locomotives
Diesel locomotives of Western Australia
Metropolitan-Vickers locomotives
Railway locomotives introduced in 1954
3 ft 6 in gauge locomotives of Australia
Diesel-electric locomotives of Australia
2′Do2′ locomotives